Bill Cutler may refer to:

Bill Cutler (baseball executive) (1920–2012), American baseball executive
Bill Cutler (footballer) (1900–1969), Australian footballer
Bill Cutler (mathematician), American mathematician and systems analyst